Peter Hermann (born August 15, 1967) is an American actor, producer and writer. He is the husband of Mariska Hargitay, with whom he has three children. He is best known for his roles as Charles Brooks in Younger and Trevor Langan in Law & Order: Special Victims Unit. And more recently, as Jack Boyle in Blue Bloods.

Early life
Hermann was born in New York City to German parents but moved to Germany when he was two months old. He lived in Germany until he was 10 and did not learn English until he returned to the United States. He attended Yale University. After college, he taught high school English through Teach For America.

Career
Hermann had brief stints on a variety of television shows that include the soap opera Guiding Light (1997–1998), the ABC Family show Beautiful People (2006) and the Lifetime original series Angela's Eyes (2006). Since 2002 he has had a recurring role as defense attorney Trevor Langan on Law & Order: Special Victims Unit.

He has made appearances in several commercials, such as the anti-tobacco "Fair Enough" ads, and has been the face for Persil ProClean detergent since the late 2010s.

In 2006, he starred as Jeremy Glick in the feature film United 93.

Hermann was in the Broadway premiere of Eric Bogosian's Talk Radio, starring Liev Schreiber, and featuring fellow Law & Order: Special Victims Unit cast member Stephanie March. It began performances on February 15, 2007, in preparation for a March 11 opening; its final Broadway performance was on June 24, 2007.

He also guested on 30 Rock during its first season and starred in ABC's mid-season replacement series Cashmere Mafia as Davis Draper. In 2011, he appeared in the Broadway play War Horse, and made occasional appearances as Erin Reagan's ex-husband John "Jack" Boyle on Blue Bloods.

From 2015 to 2021, he starred in Younger. In March 2018, HarperCollins published Hermann's children's book If the S in Moose Comes Loose.

Personal life
While appearing on Law & Order: Special Victims Unit'', Hermann met lead actress Mariska Hargitay, whom he married on August 28, 2004, in Santa Barbara, California. They have a son, who was born in 2006. In 2011, Hargitay and Hermann adopted a baby girl and 6 months later in October 2011, the couple adopted a baby boy.

Filmography

Film

Television

References

External links

20th-century American male actors
21st-century American male actors
American male television actors
Male actors from Connecticut
Living people
Writers from Greenwich, Connecticut
Yale University alumni
Male actors from New York City
American people of German descent
American expatriates in Germany
Teach For America alumni
Educators from New York City
1967 births